Andrei Vladislavovich Paukov (born 9 December 1976) is a former Russian football player.

Club career
He made his Russian Premier League debut for FC Alania Vladikavkaz on 18 July 2001 in a game against FC Dynamo Moscow.

External links
 

1976 births
Sportspeople from Oryol
Living people
Russian footballers
Association football goalkeepers
FC Oryol players
FC Spartak Vladikavkaz players
FC Volgar Astrakhan players
Moldovan Super Liga players
Russian Premier League players
Russian expatriate footballers
Expatriate footballers in Moldova
FC Spartak Nizhny Novgorod players